The 2007 Hertsmere Borough Council election took place on 3 May 2007 to elect members of Hertsmere Borough Council in Hertfordshire, England. One third of the council was up for election and the Conservative Party stayed in overall control of the council.

After the election, the composition of the council was:
Conservative 28
Liberal Democrat 7
Labour 4

Background
Before the election the Conservatives controlled the council with 28 seats, while the Liberal Democrats were the main opposition with 6 seats. 15 of the 39 seats were being contested at the election.

The election in Borehamwood Kenilworth ward saw the sitting Labour councillor for the previous 24 years, Frank Ward, stand as an independent against Conservative and Labour candidates. This came after Ward was deselected by the local Labour Party, with Ward accusing local Labour party members of a conspiracy and religious discrimination. However this was denied by Labour, with Labour saying he had "failed to meet the required standards to be considered as a Labour Party candidate".

Election result
The Conservatives maintained their majority on the council, staying on 28 seats after both gaining and losing a seat. The Liberal Democrats gained Bushey St James from the Conservatives to rise to 7 seats, but the Conservatives also gained a seat from Labour in Borehamwood Kenilworth, meaning that Labour was reduced to 4 councillors.

Conservative Penelope Swallow won in Borehamwood Kenilworth with a 49-vote majority over Labour, with independent Frank Ward having taken 216 votes. Ward said he was pleased with the result as he "was only determined that I would split the Labour vote, so to some extent I did win." However the retiring Labour group leader Leon Reefe said they felt "betrayed" by Ward.

Ward results

References

2007 English local elections
2007
2000s in Hertfordshire